Cercas is a surname. Notable people with the surname include:

Alejandro Cercas (born 1949), Spanish politician
Javier Cercas (born 1962), Spanish writer and professor